The 2016 ICC Under-19 Cricket World Cup was an international limited-overs cricket tournament held in Bangladesh from 22 January to 14 February 2016. It was the eleventh edition of the Under-19 Cricket World Cup, and the second to be held in Bangladesh, after the 2004 event.

The World Cup was contested by the national under-19 teams of sixteen International Cricket Council (ICC) members, and all matches played were held under-19 One Day International (ODI) status. Ten teams qualified automatically for the tournament through their status as ICC full members, while five others qualified by winning regional qualifying events. The final place at the tournament was taken by the winner of the 2015 Under-19 World Cup Qualifier, which was contested by the runners-up at the five regional qualifiers. However, on 5 January 2016, Cricket Australia announced that the Australian squad had pulled out of the tournament, citing security concerns. Ireland were invited as a replacement for Australia.

Defending champions South Africa were knocked out of the tournament in the group stage, with back-to-back defeats to Bangladesh and Namibia. The West Indies eventually defeated India by five wickets, claiming their first title. Bangladesh's captain Mehedi Hasan was named player of the tournament, while England's Jack Burnham and Namibia's Fritz Coetzee led the tournament in runs and wickets, respectively.

Qualification

Venues

Squads

Each team selected a 15-man squad for the tournament.

Warm-up games

Group stage

Group A

Group B

Group C

Group D

Plate League

Plate quarter-finals

Plate semi-finals

Plate final

Super League

Quarter-finals

Semi-finals

Final

Placement matches

Final

3rd-place playoff

5th-place playoff semi-finals

5th-place playoff

7th-place playoff

11th-place playoff

13th-place playoff semi-finals

13th-place playoff

15th-place playoff

Final standings

References

External links
 Series home at ESPN Cricinfo

ICC Under-19 Cricket World Cup
2016 in Bangladeshi cricket
International cricket competitions in Bangladesh
International cricket competitions in 2015–16
2016 ICC Under-19 Cricket World Cup